The 1999 Osun State gubernatorial election occurred in Nigeria on January 9, 1999. The AD nominee Adebisi Akande won the election, defeating the APP candidate.

Adebisi Akande emerged AD candidate.

Electoral system
The Governor of Osun State is elected using the plurality voting system.

Primary election

AD primary
The AD primary election was won by Adebisi Akande.

Results
The total number of registered voters in the state was 1,496,058. Total number of votes cast was 547,077, while number of valid votes was 536,252. Rejected votes were 10,825.

References 

Osun State gubernatorial elections
Osun State gubernatorial election
Osun State gubernatorial election
Osun State gubernatorial election